Rosnay is a commune in the Indre department in central France.

Geography
The commune is located in the parc naturel régional de la Brenne.

Population

See also
Communes of the Indre department
 HWU transmitter

References

Communes of Indre